Rhagio vertebratus is a species of snipe fly belonging to the family Rhagionidae.

References

External links

 

Rhagionidae
Insects described in 1823
Taxa named by Thomas Say